Sandy Lake Airport  is located adjacent to Sandy Lake, Ontario, Canada.

Airlines and destinations

See also
 Sandy Lake Water Aerodrome

References

External links

Certified airports in Kenora District